Nadjib Maâziz (born 4 May 1989) is an Algerian football player who plays for MCB Oued Sly in the Algerian Ligue Professionnelle 2.

References

External links
 

Living people
Algerian footballers
Algeria youth international footballers
Algeria under-23 international footballers
CR Belouizdad players
Algerian Ligue Professionnelle 1 players
Footballers from Algiers
1989 births
Association football defenders
21st-century Algerian people